Cripple Crow is the fifth album by psychedelic folk acoustic rocker Devendra Banhart released on September 13, 2005 on XL Recordings. It his first release on the label XL Recordings. The cover is reminiscent of the Sgt. Pepper's Lonely Hearts Club Band album cover.

Track listing
All songs written by Devendra Banhart, except where noted.

The CD release of this album also includes an MP3 bonus track "White Reggae Troll/Africa".

Bonus tracks on double LP
The double LP release of this album includes eight additional tracks, as well as an alternative cover of the normal album cover replaced with photographs of Devendra's own fans.

Personnel
Devendra Banhart – acoustic guitar, electric guitar, vocals, producer, mixing, album art direction
Emma O'Donnell – fiddle
Gus – dog
Andy Cabic – producer
Noah Georgeson – producer, engineer, mixing
Thom Monahan – producer, engineer, mixing
Galen Pehrson – album art
Alissa Anderson – album art

Charts

The album sold 47,000 copies in the US. The album has also received an Impala award for 30,000+ copies in Europe.

References

2005 albums
Devendra Banhart albums
XL Recordings albums